Buskia is a genus of bryozoans belonging to the family Buskiidae.

The genus has almost cosmopolitan distribution.

Species:

Buskia australis 
Buskia fowleri 
Buskia hachti 
Buskia inexspectata 
Buskia mogilensis 
Buskia nigribovis 
Buskia nitens 
Buskia repens 
Buskia seriata 
Buskia socialis 
Buskia waiinuensis

References

Bryozoan genera